BloodRayne is a media franchise that originated with an action-adventure video game series originally developed by Terminal Reality and published by Majesco Entertainment which began with the game of the same name in 2002. 

The franchise focuses on Rayne, a dhampir working for the Brimstone Society, a secret fraternity of individuals who works to protect humanity from supernatural threats. Additional media has been developed for the franchise in the form of film adaptations and comics.

Titles

Games

BloodRayne (2002) : set in 1933 and 1938, just before World War II. As an agent of the Brimstone Society, Rayne is sent to a variety of locations like a small swamp town in Louisiana, a Nazi fortress in Argentina, or an ancient castle in Germany, to battle supernatural creatures as well as the Nazi army. 
 In 2020, a remastered version of the game was released on PC under the title BloodRayne: Terminal Cut, and the following year on consoles as BloodRayne: ReVamped.
BloodRayne 2 (2004) : The game's plot features Rayne confronting her father vampire, Kagan. Rayne's half-siblings have banded together to form a group called the Cult of Kagan, who have pledged to create a new era of vampire supremacy. 
 In 2020, a remastered version of the game was released on PC under the title BloodRayne 2: Terminal Cut, and the following year on consoles as BloodRayne 2: ReVamped.
BloodRayne: Betrayal (2011) : A downloadable sidescrolling game. 
 A enhanced version was released in 2021 under the title BloodRayne: Betrayal - Fresh Bites.

Cancelled game
A fourth game, titled BloodRayne: The Shroud, was in development for the Nintendo 3DS. The game was put "on hold" due to Betrayal's low sales.

Future
In Summer 2020, Ziggurat Interactive bought the rights to the BloodRayne franchise and other titles from Majesco and intends to revive the series with Terminal Reality.

Common elements

Rayne

Rayne, sometimes called Agent BloodRayne, is a fictional character in the series. She is the series' titular protagonist, appearing in both games and later extended media, such as comic books and films related to the series. In English she is voiced by Laura Bailey in BloodRayne and BloodRayne 2 and Jessie Seely in BloodRayne: Betrayal.

Rayne is a human vampire hybrid called a dhampir, born 1915. Her human mother was raped by her vampire father, Kagan. Kagan later murdered her mother's entire family so that the only family member Rayne could turn to was him. Recognizing her dhampir nature as well as her skills at hunting vampires, she was recruited into the mysterious Brimstone Society via an invitation. The Brimstone Society sent her on missions to eliminate supernatural threats to the world, including those involving vampires as well as demons and unnatural apex predators.

Other media

Films adaptations
A film adaptation was released on January 6, 2006 starring Kristanna Loken as Rayne and Ben Kingsley as Kagan. The film is set in the 1800s and follows Rayne's quest to stop her father Kagan's nefarious schemes to slaughter mankind. The film was directed by Uwe Boll, who directed other video-game-to-movie adaptations including House of the Dead and Alone in the Dark. 

The film was followed by two direct-to-DVD sequels starring Natassia Malthe; 2007's BloodRayne 2: Deliverance and 2011's BloodRayne: The Third Reich. In addition, Boll directed the parody film, Blubberella, which was also released in 2011.

Comics
Several BloodRayne comic books have been published by Digital Webbing. In addition, Rayne was the first video game character to appear topless in Playboy.

References

External links

 
Video game franchises
Action-adventure video games by series
Video games featuring female protagonists
Video games adapted into films
Video games adapted into comics
Video game franchises introduced in 2002